Nikolas Caoile is an American conductor, pianist, and percussionist. He was recently appointed Music Director and Conductor of the Lake Union Civic Orchestra. In 2010, he was appointed Music Director and Conductor of the Wenatchee Valley Symphony Orchestra. And, since 2006 he has served as Director of Orchestras at Central Washington University's Department of Music.

Early life
Caoile's father, Agerico Torio Caoile, is a self-taught musician born and raised in Manila, Philippines. His mother, Bachyen Nguyen Caoile, is an accountant born in Vietnam. Caoile started piano at the age of six. Later, he studied to become a pianist and percussionist and was a member of Portland Youth Philharmonic. He received training under Huw Edwards at the Olympia Symphony Orchestra; Bruce McIntosh, a professor emeritus at Willamette University; and Peter Erős at the University of Washington. He eventually received his doctorate from the University of Michigan under Kenneth Kiesler and took a masterclass course in music with Lorin Maazel at the University of Michigan.

Career
Caoile's professional conducting debut was in 2002 with the Olympia Symphony Orchestra. In 2009, he conducted the Philharmonic Orchestra of the Americas in collaboration with Christopher Wheeldon's Morphoses Dance Company at New York City Center. From 2012 to 2016 Caoile was a conductor and artistic director of the Salem Chamber Orchestra. During those years, he also served as a guest conductor at the Gig Harbor Symphony, Northwest Mahler Festival Orchestra, and Lake Avenue Orchestras, as well as Rainier Symphony, Olympia Symphony, and Yakima Symphony Orchestra.

Currently, he serves as a Music Director and Conductor of the Wenatchee Valley Symphony Orchestra, Director of Orchestras at Central Washington University, and Music Director and Conductor of Lake Union Civic Orchestra. In an interview, Caoile said that his current orchestral interests include: Jean Sibelius's symphonies, Erich Wolfgang Korngold's film scores, Maurice Ravel's ballet scores, and Benjamin Britten's operas.

In 2018, Caoile conducted Central Washington University's Symphony Orchestra at the John F. Kennedy Center for the Performing Arts for Capital Orchestra Festival. In 2020, the CWU Symphony Orchestra was invited to perform at the Midwest Clinic in Chicago.

On November 14, 2020 Caoile made his debut as a piano concerto soloist, conducting and performing Philip Glass' Piano Concerto No. 3 from the piano with the Wenatchee Valley Symphony Orchestra. 

In December of 2021, Caoile conducted the Central Washington Symphony Orchestra at The Midwest Clinic in Chicago. Under Caoile's direction, the orchestra performed The Rite of Spring, Ravel's Tzigane, and the world premiere of Karel Butz' Diamond Jubilee (for the 75th anniversary of The Midwest Clinic).

Personal life
Caoile is married to mezzo-soprano, Dr. Melissa Schiel (CWU professor of voice).

Awards
In 2016, he was awarded Outstanding Achievement in Orchestral Direction	from the Washington State chapter of the American String Teachers Association. In 2019, Caoile was awarded the Distinguished Alumni Citation from Willamette University.

References

20th-century births
Living people
American male conductors (music)
University of Washington alumni
Willamette University alumni
University of Michigan alumni
Central Washington University faculty
Year of birth missing (living people)